Valeriy Pavlovych Petrov (2 March 1955 – 8 March 2022) was a Soviet football player and Ukrainian coach.

Biography
He played as a striker for SC Tavriya Simferopol.

Petrov died from complications of COVID-19 on 8 March 2022, at the age of 67.

References

External links
 Profile at Official Site SC Tavriya
 Profile at KLISF

1955 births
2022 deaths
Deaths from the COVID-19 pandemic in Ukraine
Sportspeople from Sevastopol
Soviet footballers
Ukrainian footballers
Association football forwards
SC Tavriya Simferopol players
Ukrainian football managers
Ukrainian Premier League managers
FC Nyva Vinnytsia managers
FC Chayka Sevastopol managers
SC Tavriya Simferopol managers
FC Sevastopol managers